A subsidy or government incentive is a form of financial aid or support extended to an economic sector (business, or individual) generally with the aim of promoting economic and social policy. Although commonly extended from the government, the term subsidy can relate to any type of support – for example from NGOs or as implicit subsidies. Subsidies come in various forms including: direct (cash grants, interest-free loans) and indirect (tax breaks, insurance, low-interest loans, accelerated depreciation, rent rebates).

Furthermore, they can be broad or narrow, legal or illegal, ethical or unethical. The most common forms of subsidies are those to the producer or the consumer. Producer/production subsidies ensure producers are better off by either supplying market price support, direct support, or payments to factors of production. Consumer/consumption subsidies commonly reduce the price of goods and services to the consumer. For example, in the US at one time it was cheaper to buy gasoline than bottled water.

Types

Production subsidy
A production subsidy encourages suppliers to increase the output of a particular product by partially offsetting the production costs or losses. The objective of production subsidies is to expand production of a particular product more so that the market would promote but without raising the final price to consumers. This type of subsidy is predominantly found in developed markets. Other examples of production subsidies include the assistance in the creation of a new firm (Enterprise Investment Scheme), industry (industrial policy) and even the development of certain areas (regional policy). Production subsidies are critically discussed in the literature as they can cause many problems including the additional cost of storing the extra produced products, depressing world market prices, and incentivizing producers to over-produce, for example, a farmer overproducing in terms of his land's carrying capacity.

Consumer/consumption subsidy
A consumption subsidy is one that subsidizes the behavior of consumers. This type of subsidies are most common in developing countries where governments subsidise such things as food, water, electricity and education on the basis that no matter how impoverished, all should be allowed those most basic requirements. For example, some governments offer 'lifeline' rates for electricity, that is, the first increment of electricity each month is subsidized. Evidence from recent studies suggests that government expenditures on subsidies remain high in many countries, often amounting to several percentage points of GDP. Subsidization on such a scale implies substantial opportunity costs. There are at least three compelling reasons for studying government subsidy behavior. First, subsidies are a major instrument of government expenditure policy. Second, on a domestic level, subsidies affect domestic resource allocation decisions, income distribution, and expenditure productivity. A consumer subsidy is a shift in demand as the subsidy is given directly to consumers.

Export subsidy
An export subsidy is a support from the government for products that are exported, as a means of assisting the country's balance of payments. Usha Haley and George Haley identified the subsidies to manufacturing industry provided by the Chinese government and how they have altered trade patterns. Traditionally, economists have argued that subsidies benefit consumers but hurt the subsidizing countries. Haley and Haley provided data to show that over the decade after China joined the World Trade Organization industrial subsidies have helped give China an advantage in industries in which they previously enjoyed no comparative advantage such as the steel, glass, paper, auto parts, and solar industries. China's shores have also collapsed from overfishing and industrialization, which is why the Chinese government heavily subsidizes its fishermen, who sail the world in search of new grounds.

Export subsidy is known for being abused. For example, some exporters substantially over declare the value of their goods so as to benefit more from the export subsidy. Another method is to export a batch of goods to a foreign country but the same goods will be re-imported by the same trader via a circuitous route and changing the product description so as to obscure their origin. Thus the trader benefits from the export subsidy without creating real trade value to the economy. Export subsidy as such can become a self-defeating and disruptive policy.

Adam Smith observed that special government subsidies enabled exporters to sell abroad at substantial ongoing losses. He did not regard that as a sound and sustainable policy. That was because “… under normal industrial-commercial conditions their own interests soon oblige loss-making businesses to deploy their capital in other ways – or to move into markets where the sales prices do cover the supply costs and yield ordinary profits. Like other mercantilist schemes and devices, export bounties are a means of trying to force business capital into channels it would not naturally enter. The schemes are invariably costly and damaging in various ways.”

Import subsidy
An import subsidy is support from the government for products that are imported. Rarer than an export subsidy, an import subsidy further reduces the price to consumers for imported goods. Import subsidies have various effects depending on the subject. For example, consumers in the importing country are better off and experience an increase in consumer welfare due to the decrease in price of the imported goods, as well as the decrease in price of the domestic substitute goods. Conversely, the consumers in the exporting country experience a decrease in consumer welfare due to an increase in the price of their domestic goods. Furthermore, producers of the importing country experience a loss of welfare due to a decrease of the price for the good in their market, while on the other side, the exporters of the producing country experience an increase in well being due to the increase in demand. Ultimately, the import subsidy is rarely used due to an overall loss of welfare for the country due to a decrease in domestic production and a reduction in production throughout the world. However, that can result in a redistribution of income.

Employment subsidy
An employment subsidy serves as an incentive to businesses to provide more job opportunities to reduce the level of unemployment in the country (income subsidies) or to encourage research and development. With an employment subsidy, the government provides assistance with wages. Another form of employment subsidy is the social security benefits. Employment subsidies allow a person receiving the benefit to enjoy some minimum standard of living.

Tax subsidy
Governments can create the same outcome through selective tax breaks as through cash payments. For example, if a government sends monetary assistance that reimburses 15% of all health expenditures to a group that is paying 15% income tax. Exactly the same subsidy is achieved by giving a health tax deduction. Tax subsidies are also known as tax expenditures.

Tax breaks are often considered to be a subsidy. Like other subsidies, they distort the economy; but tax breaks are also less transparent, and are difficult to undo.

The Multilateral Convention to Implement Tax Treaty Related Measures to Prevent Base Erosion and Profit Shifting is a treaty signed by half the nations of the world and it is aimed to prevent Base Erosion and Profit Shifting, a particular form of tax subsidy related to Intellectual Property.

Transport subsidies
Some governments subsidise transport, especially rail and bus transport, which decrease congestion and pollution compared to cars. In the EU, rail subsidies are around €73 billion, and Chinese subsidies reach $130 billion.

Publicly-owned airports can be an indirect subsidy if they lose money. The European Union, for instance, criticizes Germany for its high number of money-losing airports that are used primarily by low cost carriers, characterizing the arrangement as an illegal subsidy.

In many countries, roads and highways are paid for through general revenue, rather than tolls or other dedicated sources that are paid only by road users, creating an indirect subsidy for road transportation. The fact that long-distance buses in Germany do not pay tolls has been called an indirect subsidy by critics, who point to track access charges for railways.

Energy subsidies

Fossil fuels

Housing subsidies
Housing subsidies are designed to promote the construction industry and homeownership. As of 2018, U.S housing subsidies total around $15 billion per year. Housing subsidies can come in two types; assistance with down payment and interest rate subsidies. The deduction of mortgage interest from the federal income tax accounts for the largest interest rate subsidy. Additionally, the federal government will help low-income families with the down payment, coming to $10.9 million in 2008.

Environmental externalities

While conventional subsidies require financial support, many economists have described implicit subsidies in the form of untaxed environmental externalities. These externalities include things such as pollution from vehicle emissions, pesticides, or other sources.

A 2015 report studied the implicit subsidies accruing to 20 fossil fuel companies. It estimated that the societal costs from downstream emissions and pollution attributable to these companies were substantial. The report spans the period 2008–2012 and notes that: "for all companies and all years, the economic cost to society of their  emissions was greater than their after‐tax profit, with the single exception of ExxonMobil in 2008." Pure coal companies fare even worse: "the economic cost to society exceeds total revenue (employment, taxes, supply purchases, and indirect employment) in all years, with this cost varying between nearly $2 and nearly $9 per $1 of revenue."

Categorising subsidies

Broad and narrow
These various subsidies can be divided into broad and narrow. Narrow subsidies are those monetary transfers that are easily identifiable and have a clear intent. They are commonly characterised by a monetary transfer between governments and institutions or businesses and individuals. A classic example is a government payment to a farmer.

Conversely broad subsidies include both monetary and non-monetary subsidies and is often difficult to identify. A broad subsidy is less attributable and less transparent. Environmental externalities are the most common type of broad subsidy.

Economic effects

Competitive equilibrium is a state of balance between buyers and suppliers, in which the quantity demanded of a good is the quantity supplied at a specified price. When the price falls the quantity demand exceeds the equilibrium quantity, conversely, a reduction in the supply of a good beyond equilibrium quantity implies an increase in the price. The effect of a subsidy is to shift the supply or demand curve to the right (i.e. increases the supply or demand) by the amount of the subsidy. If a consumer is receiving the subsidy, a lower price of a good resulting from the marginal subsidy on consumption increases demand, shifting the demand curve to the right. If a supplier is receiving the subsidy, an increase in the price (revenue) resulting from the marginal subsidy on production results increases supply, shifting the supply curve to the right.

Assuming the market is in a perfectly competitive equilibrium, a subsidy increases the supply of the good beyond the equilibrium competitive quantity. The imbalance creates deadweight loss. Deadweight loss from a subsidy is the amount by which the cost of the subsidy exceeds the gains of the subsidy. The magnitude of the deadweight loss is dependent on the size of the subsidy. This is considered a market failure, or inefficiency.

Subsidies targeted at goods in one country, by lowering the price of those goods, make them more competitive against foreign goods, thereby reducing foreign competition. As a result, many developing countries cannot engage in foreign trade, and receive lower prices for their products in the global market. This is considered protectionism: a government policy to erect trade barriers in order to protect domestic industries. The problem with protectionism arises when industries are selected for nationalistic reasons (infant-industry), rather than to gain a comparative advantage. The market distortion, and reduction in social welfare, is the logic behind the World Bank policy for the removal of subsidies in developing countries.

Subsidies create spillover effects in other economic sectors and industries. A subsidized product sold in the world market lowers the price of the good in other countries. Since subsidies result in lower revenues for producers of foreign countries, they are a source of tension between the United States, Europe and poorer developing countries. While subsidies may provide immediate benefits to an industry, in the long-run they may prove to have unethical, negative effects. Subsidies are intended to support public interest, however, they can violate ethical or legal principles if they lead to higher consumer prices or discriminate against some producers to benefit others. For example, domestic subsidies granted by individual US states may be unconstitutional if they discriminate against out-of-state producers, violating the Privileges and Immunities Clause or the Dormant Commerce Clause of the United States Constitution. Depending on their nature, subsidies are discouraged by international trade agreements such as the World Trade Organization (WTO). This trend, however, may change in the future, as needs of sustainable development and environmental protection could suggest different interpretations regarding energy and renewable energy subsidies. In its July 2019 report, "Going for Growth 2019: The time for reform is now", the OECD suggests that countries make better use of environmental taxation, phase out agricultural subsidies and environmentally harmful tax breaks.

Preventing fraud
In the Netherlands, audits are performed to verify whether the funds that have been received has indeed been spent legally (and all requirements of the subsidy provider have been attained), for the purpose intended. It hence prevents fraud.

Perverse subsidies

Definitions
Although subsidies can be important, many are "perverse", in the sense of having adverse unintended consequences. To be "perverse", subsidies must exert effects that are demonstrably and significantly adverse both economically and environmentally. A subsidy rarely, if ever, starts perverse, but over time a legitimate efficacious subsidy can become perverse or illegitimate if it is not withdrawn after meeting its goal or as political goals change. Perverse subsidies are now so widespread that as of 2007 they amounted $2 trillion per year in the six most subsidised sectors alone (agriculture, fossil fuels, road transportation, water, fisheries and forestry).

Effects
The detrimental effects of perverse subsidies are diverse in nature and reach. Case-studies from differing sectors are highlighted below but can be summarised as follows.

Directly, they are expensive to governments by directing resources away from other legitimate should priorities (such as environmental conservation, education, health, or infrastructure), ultimately reducing the fiscal health of the government.

Indirectly, they cause environmental degradation (exploitation of resources, pollution, loss of landscape, misuse and overuse of supplies) which, as well as its fundamental damage, acts as a further brake on economies; tend to benefit the few at the expense of the many, and the rich at the expense of the poor; lead to further polarization of development between the Northern and Southern hemispheres; lower global market prices; and undermine investment decisions reducing the pressure on businesses to become more efficient. Over time the latter effect means support becomes enshrined in human behaviour and business decisions to the point where people become reliant on, even addicted to, subsidies, 'locking' them into society.

Consumer attitudes do not change and become out-of-date, off-target and inefficient; furthermore, over time people feel a sense of historical right to them.

Implementation
Perverse subsidies are not tackled as robustly as they should be. Principally, this is because they become 'locked' into society, causing bureaucratic roadblocks and institutional inertia. When cuts are suggested many argue (most fervently by those 'entitled', special interest groups and political lobbyists) that it will disrupt and harm the lives of people who receive them, distort domestic competitiveness curbing trade opportunities, and increase unemployment. Individual governments recognise this as a 'prisoner's dilemma' – insofar as that even if they wanted to adopt subsidy reform, by acting unilaterally they fear only negative effects will ensue if others do not follow. Furthermore, cutting subsidies, however perverse they may be, is considered a vote-losing policy.

Reform of perverse subsidies is at a propitious time. The current economic conditions mean governments are forced into fiscal constraints and are looking for ways to reduce activist roles in their economies. There are two main reform paths: unilateral and multilateral. Unilateral agreements (one country) are less likely to be undertaken for the reasons outlined above, although New Zealand, Russia, Bangladesh and others represent successful examples. Multilateral actions by several countries are more likely to succeed as this reduces competitiveness concerns, but are more complex to implement requiring greater international collaboration through a body such as the WTO. Irrespective of the path, the aim of policymakers should be to: create alternative policies that target the same issue as the original subsidies but better; develop subsidy removal strategies allowing market-discipline to return; introduce 'sunset' provisions that require remaining subsidies to be re-justified periodically; and make perverse subsidies more transparent to taxpayers to alleviate the 'vote-loser' concern.

Examples

Agricultural subsidies
Support for agriculture dates back to the 19th century. It was developed extensively in the EU and USA across the two World Wars and the Great Depression to protect domestic food production, but remains important across the world today. In 2005, US farmers received $14 billion and EU farmers $47 billion in agricultural subsidies. Today, agricultural subsidies are defended on the grounds of helping farmers to maintain their livelihoods. The majority of payments are based on outputs and inputs and thus favour the larger producing agribusinesses over the small-scale farmers. In the USA nearly 30% of payments go to the top 2% of farmers.

By subsidising inputs and outputs through such schemes as 'yield based subsidisation', farmers are encouraged to over-produce using intensive methods, including using more fertilizers and pesticides; grow high-yielding monocultures; reduce crop rotation; shorten fallow periods; and promote exploitative land use change from forests, rainforests and wetlands to agricultural land. These all lead to severe environmental degradation, including adverse effects on soil quality and productivity including erosion, nutrient supply and salinity which in turn affects carbon storage and cycling, water retention and drought resistance; water quality including pollution, nutrient deposition and eutrophication of waterways, and lowering of water tables; diversity of flora and fauna including indigenous species both directly and indirectly through the destruction of habitats, resulting in a genetic wipe-out.

Cotton growers in the US reportedly receive half their income from the government under the Farm Bill of 2002. The subsidy payments stimulated overproduction and resulted in a record cotton harvest in 2002, much of which had to be sold at very reduced prices in the global market. For foreign producers, the depressed cotton price lowered their prices far below the break-even price. In fact, African farmers received 35 to 40 cents per pound for cotton, while US cotton growers, backed by government agricultural payments, received 75 cents per pound. Developing countries and trade organizations argue that poorer countries should be able to export their principal commodities to survive, but protectionist laws and payments in the United States and Europe prevent these countries from engaging in international trade opportunities.

Fisheries
Today, much of the world's major fisheries are overexploited; in 2002, the WWF estimate this at approximately 75%. Fishing subsidies include "direct assistant to fishers; loan support programs; tax preferences and insurance support; capital and infrastructure programs; marketing and price support programs; and fisheries management, research, and conservation programs." They promote the expansion of fishing fleets, the supply of larger and longer nets, larger yields and indiscriminate catch, as well as mitigating risks which encourages further investment into large-scale operations to the disfavour of the already struggling small-scale industry. Collectively, these result in the continued overcapitalization and overfishing of marine fisheries.

There are four categories of fisheries subsidies. First are direct financial transfers, second are indirect financial transfers and services. Third, certain forms of intervention and fourth, not intervening. The first category regards direct payments from the government received by the fisheries industry. These typically affect profits of the industry in the short term and can be negative or positive. Category two pertains to government intervention, not involving those under the first category. These subsidies also affect the profits in the short term but typically are not negative. Category three includes intervention that results in a negative short-term economic impact, but economic benefits in the long term. These benefits are usually more general societal benefits such as the environment. The final category pertains to inaction by the government, allowing producers to impose certain production costs on others. These subsidies tend to lead to positive benefits in the short term but negative in the long term.

Manufacturing subsidies
A survey of manufacturing in Britain found government subsidies had had various unintended dysfunctional consequences. The subsidies had usually been selective or discriminatory – benefiting some companies at the expense of others. Government money in the form of grants and awards of production and R&D contracts had gone to advanced and viable firms as well as old uneconomic enterprises. However, the main recipients had been larger, established companies – while most of the firms pioneering radical technical-product developments with long-term economic growth potential had been new small enterprises. 
The study concluded that instead of providing subsidies, governments wanting to benefit industrial-technological development and performance should lower standard rates of business taxation, raise tax allowances for investments in new plant, equipment and products, and remove obstacles to market competition and customer choice.

Others
The US National Football League's (NFL) profits have topped records at $11 billion, the highest of all sports. The NFL had tax-exempt status until voluntarily relinquishing it in 2015, and new stadiums have been built with public subsidies.

The Commitment to Development Index (CDI), published by the Center for Global Development, measures the effect that subsidies and trade barriers actually have on the undeveloped world. It uses trade, along with six other components such as aid or investment, to rank and evaluate developed countries on policies that affect the undeveloped world. It finds that the richest countries spend $106 billion per year subsidizing their own farmers – almost exactly as much as they spend on foreign aid.

Short list of subsidies
 Agricultural subsidy
 Fisheries subsidy
 Export subsidy
 Energy subsidy
 Fossil fuel subsidies (oil subsidies, coal subsidies, gas subsidies)
 Photovoltaics subsidy
 Party subsidies
 Wage subsidy
 Artist subsidy (Netherlands)

See also
 Agricultural subsidy
 Cross subsidization
 Cultural subsidy
 Energy subsidy
 Subsidization of company cars
 Federal government
 Audit software in governmental procurement
 Municipal services
 Perverse incentive
 Rail subsidies
 Stadium subsidy
 Tax exemption
 Wage subsidy

References

Further reading

 OECD (2001) Environmentally Harmful Subsidies: Policy Issues and Challenges. France: OECD Productions. http://www.inecc.gob.mx/descargas/dgipea/harmful_subsidies.pdf

External links
 Another Day, Another Bad Incentive Deal (2014-06-06), Naked Capitalism

Fiscal policy
Grants (money)
Payments